Calimucho is a 2008 Dutch/European feature film, directed by Eugenie Jansen. The film is about the problems within a small family circus, was entirely shot travelling with a small existing circus on tour, the cast consisting of the circus members, but is not a documentary: The story is entirely scripted, written by Natasha Gerson.

See also 
 Kalimotxo

References

External links 
 

2008 films
2000s Dutch-language films
2008 drama films
Dutch drama films